Two American football franchises have been referred to as the Barcelona Dragons:

 Barcelona Dragons (NFL Europe), active in NFL Europe between 1991 and 2003;
 Barcelona Dragons (ELF), active in the European League of Football since 2021.